#Hits is a greatest hits album consisting of songs by the British recording artist Example. It was released on 5 August 2013. It is Example's final release with Ministry of Sound, as he is now signed to Epic Records. According to Example he has received negative feedback regarding the decision to release a compilation album. He released a statement on his official Instagram profile saying the release was decided by Ministry of Sound and "totally beyond my control". It debuted at number 11 on the UK Albums Chart.

Track listing

Charts

Certifications

References 

Example (musician) albums
2013 greatest hits albums
Ministry of Sound compilation albums